William G. Wilson  (October 28, 1867 – May 9, 1924) was a professional baseball player. He played all or part of three seasons in Major League Baseball, primarily as a catcher. He played for the 1890 Pittsburgh Alleghenys and 1897–98 Louisville Colonels.

Personal life
After retiring from baseball, Wilson became involved in petty crime, eventually being charged in 1909 with forging postal money orders. On May 9, 1924, Wilson's bloodied body was found in a St Paul, Minnesota ice-cream parlour by police after an anonymous phone call. He had been stabbed ten times. Police believed that Wilson had been murdered over a dispute regarding the distribution of illegal moneys from a crime.

References

Sources

1867 births
1924 deaths
Major League Baseball catchers
Pittsburgh Alleghenys players
Louisville Colonels players
St. Paul Saints (Western League) players
Kansas City Blue Stockings players
Peoria Distillers players
Galesburg Hornets players
Baseball players from Missouri
19th-century baseball players
People from Hannibal, Missouri
American murder victims
People murdered in Minnesota
Deaths by stabbing in the United States
American sportspeople convicted of crimes
People convicted of forgery